Beckov is a village and municipality in Nové Mesto nad Váhom District in the Trenčín Region of western Slovakia.

History
In historical records the village was first mentioned in 1208. Mihály de genere Bána, royal equerry, who was the forefather of the Cseszneky family, performed several heroic deeds against the Mongolian invaders of Hungary (during the invasion in 1241–42) and for his bravery in 1241 King Béla IV appointed him Count (comes) of Beckó.

Geography
The municipality lies at an altitude of 190 metres and covers an area of 28.629 km2. It has a population of about 1375 people.

Sights
Above the village is Beckov Castle, now in ruins.

People
 Jozef Miloslav Hurban born 1817 
 Baron László Mednyánszky born 1852 
 Dionýz Štúr born 1827

Gallery

Sources
 Györffy György: Az Árpád-kori Magyarország történeti földrajza

Genealogical resources

The records for genealogical research are available at the state archive "Statny Archiv in Bratislava,Slovakia"

 Roman Catholic church records (births/marriages/deaths): 1676-1934 (parish A)
 Lutheran church records (births/marriages/deaths): 1792-1942 (parish A)

See also
 List of municipalities and towns in Slovakia

References

External links

Municipal website 
Surnames of living people in Beckov

Villages and municipalities in Nové Mesto nad Váhom District